Josh Thornhill (born January 19, 1980) is a former professional American football linebacker who played for the Detroit Lions in 2002.

External links
Pro-Football-Reference

1980 births
Detroit Lions players
Living people
American football linebackers
People from Lansing, Michigan
Michigan State Spartans football players
Players of American football from Michigan